The Daily Citizen may refer to:

United States newspapers
 Cushing Citizen, a daily newspaper in Cushing, Oklahoma
 The Daily Citizen (Iowa), a daily newspaper published in Iowa City, Iowa
 The Daily Citizen (Dalton), a daily newspaper in Dalton, Georgia
 The Daily Citizen (Searcy), a daily newspaper in Searcy, Arkansas

 Beaver Dam Daily Citizen, a daily newspaper by Lee Enterprises in Beaver Dam, Wisconsin
 Linton Daily Citizen, the former name of Greene County Daily World, a daily newspaper in Linton Township, Ohio
 Urbana Daily Citizen, a daily newspaper in Urbana, Ohio

Other uses
 Daily Citizen (British newspaper), a short-lived newspaper

See also
 The Citizen (disambiguation)